The 2022–23 Rugby-Bundesliga is the 52nd edition of this competition and the 103rd edition of the German rugby union championship. 

SC 1880 Frankfurt are the defending champions.

Teams

A total of sixteen teams are participating in the 2022–23 edition of the Rugby-Bundesliga.

Team changes

Stadiums and locations

Regular season

North-East

Table

Results

South-West

Table

Results

References

External links 
 rugbyweb.de - Rugby-Bundesliga table & results 
 Totalrugby.de - Bundesliga table & results 
 Rugby-Bundesliga at scoresway.com

2022–23
2022–23 in German rugby union
Germany
Germany